Saubens is a commune in the Haute-Garonne department in southwestern France.

Population
The inhabitants of the commune are known as Saubenois in French.

See also
Communes of the Haute-Garonne department

References

Communes of Haute-Garonne